Currie Dixon (born September 2, 1985) is a Canadian politician, leader of the Yukon Party, and MLA for Copperbelt North. Dixon was a cabinet minister in the government of Darrell Pasloski and is the former MLA for Copperbelt North, having served from 2011 until 2016.

Early life 
Dixon was born and raised in Whitehorse, Yukon.

Political career
Dixon was elected to the  Yukon Legislative Assembly in the general election of October 11, 2011, in the newly created riding of Copperbelt North. He defeated Liberal Leader Arthur Mitchell, then Leader of the Official Opposition, for the seat.

He was sworn into Cabinet on November 5, 2011, as the Minister of Environment and Minister of Economic Development. He was appointed Minister of Community Services and Minister of the Public Service Commission on January 16, 2015.

He is the youngest Cabinet minister in Yukon history and among the youngest in Canadian history.

On June 15, 2016, Dixon announced that he would not seek a second term as MLA of Copperbelt North. The Yukon Party government was reduced to the opposition as a result of the election.

Leadership
On December 5, 2019, Dixon announced that he would run in the Yukon Party leadership election, which will be held on May 23, 2020. He was elected as leader of the Yukon Party on May 23, 2020, replacing Darrell Pasloski, who resigned in November 2016, and interim leader Stacey Hassard; he defeated opponents Linda Benoit and Brad Cathers in two ballots.

Dixon led the party into the 2021 territorial election, the Yukon Party won 8 seats and won the popular vote overall. Dixon was personally elected in the district of Copperbelt North. On April 23, the incumbent Liberals were sworn in with a minority government. On April 28, the NDP announced that they had entered into a formal confidence and supply agreement with the Liberals.

Personal life
Dixon worked as a senior policy advisor to the Premier in the Yukon Cabinet Offices after completing university and before entering politics.

Dixon holds an undergraduate degree in political science and history from Saint Francis Xavier University (2008). and a graduate degree in political science from the University of Northern British Columbia (2011), focusing on the relationship between the Yukon and First Nations governments in the area of education.

Electoral record

Yukon Party leadership election, 2020

Yukon general election, 2011

|-

|-

| Liberal
| Arthur Mitchell
| align="right"| 407
| align="right"| 37.4%
| align="right"| –
|-

| NDP
| Skeeter Miller-Wright
| align="right"| 159
| align="right"| 14.6%
| align="right"| –
|-
! align=left colspan=3|Total
! align=right| 1088
! align=right| 100.0%
! align=right| –
|}

References

Yukon Party MLAs
Living people
Politicians from Whitehorse
21st-century Canadian politicians
Yukon political party leaders
1985 births